Richard Beaudoin (born October 10, 1975) is an American composer of contemporary music. His music and writings explore compositional uses of expressive timing, or microtiming.

Life 
Beaudoin was born in North Attleborough, Massachusetts. He graduated from North Attleborough High School in 1993, studied privately with bassist Mibbit Threats, and enrolled at Amherst College in 1993 where he remained for three years, studying with Lewis Spratlan.

In 1996, he withdrew from Amherst College and spent a year living in Mortlake, near London, studying composition privately with Michael Finnissy. He returned to Amherst College and graduated summa cum laude in 1998. He was a MacDowell Colony Fellow in January 1999.

In 2000, Beaudoin returned to London and earned his M.Mus. in Music Composition from London's Royal Academy of Music in 2002, studying again with Michael Finnissy. He returned to the United States and, in 2008, earned his Ph.D. in Composition and Music Theory from Brandeis University, studying composition with David Rakowski and Martin Boykan, and theory with Eric Chafe.

While still a Ph.D. student at Brandeis, he held two visiting professorships at Amherst College: as Joseph A. and Grace W. Valentine Visiting Professor of Music at Amherst College (2005–06) and as Visiting Professor of Music (2007). Since earning his Ph.D., he has taught composition and theory at Harvard University, first as lecturer on Music (2008–11) and then as Preceptor in Music (2011–present).

Music 
Beaudoin's most widely performed works are those related to expressive timing, or microtiming. This process, which he developed in 2009 with the Swiss musicologist Olivier Senn, is based on millisecond-level microtemporal analyses of recorded performances. The timing measurements of every sound in a given recording are used to create a detailed transcription of the recording in musical notation, often in elongation.

Beaudoin has composed cycles of works based on microtimings of specific recordings. The twelve works in the series Études d'un prélude (2009–2010) are based on Martha Argerich's October 1975 recording of Chopin's E minor Prélude, Op. 28, no. 4. The six works in the series The Artist and his Model (2010–2012) are based on Alfred Cortot's July 1931 recording of Debussy's Prélude, "...La file aux cheveux de lin". Other source works have included Maurizio Pollini performing Anton Webern (nach Webern, nach Pollini 2011), Thelonious Monk improvising on "Body and Soul" (Now anything can hang at any angle 2011), and Pablo Casals performing Johann Sebastian Bach (Ebenbild 2014).

In addition to the music based on microtiming, Beaudoin has written over 50 songs, including a cycle of 17 songs called Nach-Fragen (The Inquiries), for the German soprano Annette Dasch, commissioned by the Konzerthaus Dortmund. He has also composed chamber operas for Boston Lyric Opera and Staatstheater Kassel.

Writings on these works, by Beaudoin and others, have appeared in the Journal of Music Theory, Perspectives of New Music, Divergence Press, The Journal of Aesthetics and Art Criticism, and David Bard-Schwarz's 2014 book, An Introduction to Electronic Art Through the Teaching of Jacques Lacan: Strangest Thing. Beaudoin has lectured widely on his music, including at the Centre for Music and Science at Cambridge University, the Royal Academy of Music in London, and at the Hochschule, Luzern in Switzerland.

Recordings include Microtimings (New Focus Recordings, 2012), a double album by Mark Knoop and the Kreutzer Quartet, and Constantine Finehouse's Backwards Glance Piano Music by Brahms and Beaudoin (Spicerack Records, 2010). A collection of six scores was published in the handmade artist book Richard Beaudoin: The Artist and his Model (Daniel Kelm, 2014).

Works (partial list)

Notes

External links
 

1975 births
Living people
Amherst College alumni
MacDowell Colony fellows
Brandeis University alumni
Alumni of the Royal Academy of Music
21st-century classical composers
American opera composers
Male opera composers
American male classical composers
American classical composers
People from North Attleborough, Massachusetts
Musicians from Massachusetts
Amherst College faculty
Brandeis University faculty
21st-century American composers